James Wong (Wong Liang Hun, ; born 8 May 1953) is a Singaporean fencer. He competed in the individual foil and épée events at the 1992 Summer Olympics.

Wong first came to Singapore to join the Republic of Singapore Air Force. He won silver medals at the 1989, 1991, and 1993 Southeast Asian Games. After his retirement, he became a vice-president of the Singapore Fencing Association and a coach for the national team. He also co-founded Z Fencing, a chain of fencing schools.

References

External links
 
 

1953 births
Living people
Singaporean male épée fencers
Olympic fencers of Singapore
Fencers at the 1992 Summer Olympics
People from Malacca
Singaporean male foil fencers